Attoor Krishna Pisharody (1875–1964) was a Sanskrit scholar, teacher and writer from Kerala, India. He was born on September 29, 1875, in Vadakkancheri in Thrissur district to Narayanan Namboothiri and Pappikkutty Pisharasyar. He learned Sanskrit in the traditional way from Kodungalloor Godavarma Bhattan Thampuran.  From 1911 to 1929 he taught at Maharajas college (present day University college), Trivandrum and for the next five years worked as the Sanskrit tutor to the Maharaja of Travancore. He was the editor of two magazines Rasika rathnam and Mangalodayam.  He was a veena artist and musicologist well. He died on  June 5, 1964.

Major works
Sangeetha chandrika
Bhashayum Sahityavum
Bhasha sahitya charitham
Kerala charitham
Vidya vivekam
Bhasha darpanam
Uthara Ramayanam (Translation)
Shakunthalam (Translation)
Leelathilakam (Commentary on the 14th century text Leelathilakam)

References

External links
 legendS
 

1875 births
1964 deaths
Writers from Kerala
Malayalam-language writers
Indian Sanskrit scholars
Translators of Kalidasa
Academic staff of the University College Thiruvananthapuram
People from Thrissur district
Indian musicologists
19th-century Indian translators
19th-century Indian educational theorists
20th-century Indian translators
20th-century Indian educational theorists